Güzeloluk (former Yağda-Koyuncu) is a village in Erdemli district of Mersin Province. The population of Güzeloluk was 618  as of 2012. The village was founded in 1865. The present name of the village refers to a public fountain built in the village.

References

Villages in Erdemli District
Yaylas in Turkey